Yesterday Was Forever is the fourth studio album by English singer-songwriter Kate Nash. Her first album in five years,  the record notably sees Nash return to her indie pop roots. It was released independently and funded by fans via Kickstarter. To promote the album, Nash embarked on the Yesterday Was Forever Tour in the United States and Canada, and has performed at several festivals, including Reading and Leeds Festival.

The album's themes revolve around mental health and relationships. Nash openly confirmed that she has obsessive–compulsive disorder and anxiety and is an advocate for raising awareness for the importance of mental health. "Musical Theatre" is Nash's personal interpretation of struggling with mental health.

Track listing

Reception

At Metacritic, a review aggregator which assigns a normalized rating out of 100 to reviews from mainstream critics, the album received an average score of 63, based on 13 reviews, which indicates "generally favorable reviews".

References

2018 albums
Kate Nash albums